Innamorata is a 2014 Philippine television drama romance fantasy series broadcast by GMA Network. Directed by Don Michael Perez, it stars Max Collins in the title role. It premiered on February 17, 2014 on the network's Afternoon Prime line up replacing Magkano Ba ang Pag-ibig?. The series concluded on June 20, 2014 with a total of 88 episodes. It was replaced by Dading in its timeslot.

The series is streaming online on YouTube.

Cast and characters

Lead cast
 Max Collins as Esperanza "Esper" Cunanan-Manansala / Clara / Evangeline Cunanan / Alejandra  

Supporting cast
 Luis Alandy as Edwin Manansala / Arnaldo Manansala
 Dion Ignacio as Dencio I. Manansala
 Jackie Rice as Georgina "Gina" C. Manriquez
 Gwen Zamora as Alejandra Villa Ignacio-Padilla
 Michael de Mesa as Lloyd Manansala
 Rita Avila as Claire Cunanan / Alice Cunanan-Manriquez
 Pinky Amador as Delia Cunanan
 Juan Rodrigo as Leandro Padilla
 Ralph Fernandez as Lucas "Luke" Manansala
 Lovely Rivero as Corazon "Cora" Isidro-Manansala
 Luz Fernandez as Belenita "Belen" Fuentebella

Guest cast
 Elijah Alejo as young Esperanza
 Ryza Cenon as Priscilla Manansala
 Will Ashley as young Dencio
 Leandro Baldemor as Cenon Manriquez
 Menggie Cobarrubias as Fernan Villa Ignacio
 Marco Alcaraz as Juanito Padilla
 Marnie Lapus as Malou

Ratings
According to AGB Nielsen Philippines' Mega Manila household television ratings, the pilot episode of Innamorata earned a 12.2% rating. While the final episode scored a 15.3% rating.

Accolades

References

External links
 
 

2014 Philippine television series debuts
2014 Philippine television series endings
Filipino-language television shows
GMA Network drama series
Philippine romance television series
Television shows set in Quezon City